Monochamus subfasciatus is a species of beetle in the family Cerambycidae. It was described by Henry Walter Bates in 1873. It is recorded from Japan where it infests Japanese red pine and is a vector of the nematode Bursaphelenchus doui.

Subspecies
 Monochamus subfasciatus kumageinsularis Hayashi, 1962
 Monochamus subfasciatus meridianus Hayashi, 1955
 Monochamus subfasciatus shikokuensis Breuning, 1956
 Monochamus subfasciatus subfasciatus (Bates, 1873)

References

subfasciatus
Beetles described in 1873